Dongbok O clan was one of the Korean clans. Their Bon-gwan was in Hwasun County, South Jeolla Province. According to the research in 2015, the number of Dongbok O clan was 72394. Hw was appointed as the governor of Dongbok County, which was renamed Hwansun in later era, during the King Gojong of Goryeo’s reign in Goryeo dynasty and began Dongbok O clan.

References